In the New Testament, the Sanhedrin trial of Jesus refers to the trial of Jesus before the Sanhedrin (a Jewish judicial body) following his arrest in Jerusalem and prior to the trial before Pontius Pilate. It is an incident reported by all three Synoptic Gospels of the New Testament, while the Gospel of John refers to a preliminary inquiry before Annas. The gospel accounts vary on a number of details.

Jesus is generally quiet, does not defend himself, rarely responds to the accusations, and is found guilty of: violating the Sabbath law (by healing on the Sabbath); threatening to destroy the Jewish Temple; practicing sorcery, exorcising people by the power of demons; and claiming to be the Messiah. He is then taken to Pontius Pilate, the governor of Roman Judaea, to be tried for claiming to be the King of the Jews.

Evening inquest at Caiaphas' palace
In the narrative in the synoptic gospels, after the arrest of Jesus he is taken to the private residence of Caiaphas, the high priest. Matthew 26 (Matthew 26:57) states that Jesus was taken to the house of Caiaphas the High Priest of Israel, where the scribes and the elders were gathered together. Mark 14 (Mark 14:53) states that Jesus was taken that night "to the high priest" (without naming the priest), where all the chief priests and the elders gathered. 

According to John's gospel, Jesus was taken not to Caiaphas but to Annas, who questioned him only privately. A former high priest and father-in-law of Caiaphas, Annas remained very influential. The fact that Jesus was taken not to Caiaphas but to Annas is explained on the ground that the latter's palace was nearer the place of arrest than that of the former. Peter and other disciples, however, being ignorant of the state of affairs, went to Caiaphas' house in the night.

In all four Gospel accounts, the trial of Jesus before the priests and scribes is interleaved with the Denial of Peter narrative, where Apostle Peter, who has followed Jesus, denies knowing him three times. The intercalated narrative of Jesus' resolute determination offers contrast to the framing narrative of Peter's aggrieved denials (Mark 14:53–54, 14:66–72). Luke 22 (Luke 22:61) states that as Jesus was bound and standing at the priest's house Peter was in the courtyard. Jesus "turned and looked straight at him", and Peter remembered the words Jesus had spoken to him: "Before the rooster crows today, you will disown me three times."

In John 18 (John 18:24), Jesus is sent from Annas to Caiaphas the high priest. Both Matthew and Mark say that another consultation was held among the priests the next morning. The second interview with Jesus was "...evidently held in the house of Caiaphas, rather than in the Chamber of Hewn Stone...."

According to Luke 22:63, at Caiaphas' house, Jesus is mocked and beaten. He is accused of claiming to be both the Messiah and the Son of God. Although the Gospel accounts vary with respect to some of the details, they agree on the general character and overall structure of the trials of Jesus.

Mark 14:55–59 states that the chief priests sought witnesses to testify against Jesus but did not find any. Matthew characterizes these as false witnesses. Many gave false witness against him, but their testimony did not agree. Finally two came forward and accused him of saying "I am able to destroy the temple and raise it again in three days".  Theologian Eckhard J. Schnabel points out that if the Sanhedrin had wished to contrive false testimony they would have prepared the witnesses so that their statements would have confirmed rather than contradicted each other.

In the Gospel accounts, Jesus speaks very little, and gives very infrequent and indirect answers to the questions of the priests, according to John 18:22 prompting an officer to slap him. In Matthew 26:62, the lack of response from Jesus prompts the high priest to ask him: "Answerest thou nothing?" In the Gospel accounts, the men that hold Jesus at the high priest's house mock, blindfold, insult and beat him, at times slapping him and asking him to guess who had hit him that time.

Mark 14:61 states that the high priest then asked Jesus: "Art thou the Christ, the Son of the Blessed?" And Jesus said "I am", at which point the high priest tore his own robe in anger and accused Jesus of blasphemy. In Matthew 26:63, the high priest asks: "Tell us whether you are the Christ, the Son of God." Jesus responds "You have said it", and added "But I say to all of you:  In the future you will see the Son of Man sitting at the right hand of the Mighty One and coming on the clouds of heaven", prompting the High Priest to tear his own robe, breaking Mosaic Law (Leviticus 21:10), and to accuse him of blasphemy.

According to Luke, Joseph of Arimathea was a counsellor, a member of the Sanhedrin who dissented from the decision. According to John, Nicodemus was with Joseph of Arimathea to recover and bury Jesus' body, leading to the inference that he also dissented.

Morning arraignment and trial 
 
Luke 22:66 states that, "as soon as it was day", the chief priests and scribes gathered together and led Jesus away into their council. John 18:28 states that, early in the morning, Jesus was led from Caiaphas to Pontius Pilate in the Praetorium.

In Luke 22:67, Jesus is asked: "If thou art the Christ, tell us. But he said unto them, If I tell you, ye will not believe". But, in 22:70, when asked "Are you then the Son of God?", Jesus answers "You say that I am", affirming the title Son of God. At that point, the priests say "What further need have we of witness? for we ourselves have heard from his own mouth", and they decide to condemn Jesus.

Thereafter, in Pilate's Court, the Jewish elders ask Pontius Pilate to judge and condemn Jesus, accusing him of claiming to be the King of the Jews. Such a claim would be considered treasonous for being a direct challenge to the Roman authorities.

Commentary
The historicity of the gospel narratives has been questioned by scholars, who suggest that the evangelists' accounts reflect the later antagonism that arose between the Church and the Synagogue. They show a tendency to minimize the actions of Pilate and emphasize the responsibilities of the Jews. Pilate's effectiveness as governor depended on cooperation with the aristocratic Jewish leadership. Provincial governors "...had full jurisdiction over capital cases, even when they worked in conjunction with local courts".

Comparison

Narrative comparison

Chronological comparison

See also

 Chronology of Jesus
 Jesus at Herod's court
 Denial of Peter
 Kiss of Judas
 Life of Jesus in the New Testament
 Passion of Jesus
 Pilate's court
 Thirty Pieces of Silver

References

Citations

Sources

Further reading

 Brown, Raymond E., et al. The New Jerome Biblical Commentary. Prentice Hall, 1990, .
 Crossan, Dominic, Who Killed Jesus? Exposing the Roots of Anti-Semitism in the Gospel Story of the Death of Jesus, 1995, .

 Paul Winter, On the Trial of Jesus. Berlin: Walter de Gruyer, 1961 (second revised edition edited by T.A. Burkill and Geza Vermes, Berlin: Walter de Gruyer, 1974).

External links
 

1st century in law
Caiaphas
Judaism in the New Testament
Passion of Jesus
Sanhedrin
Stations of the Cross
Trials
Joseph of Arimathea